Leroy A. Mendonca (August 2, 1932 – July 4, 1951) was a soldier in the United States Army during the Korean War. He posthumously received the Medal of Honor for his actions on July 4, 1951.

Early life

Leroy was born in Honolulu, Territory of Hawaii, on 2 August 1932, and was of Portuguese ancestry. While attending President William McKinley High School, he was an AJROTC cadet, and graduated in 1950.

Medal of Honor citation
Rank and organization: Sergeant, U.S. Army, Company B, 7th Infantry Regiment, 3rd Infantry Division

Place and date: Near Chich-on, Korea, July 4, 1951

Entered service at: Honolulu, T.H. Birth: Honolulu, T.H.

G.O. No.: 83, September 3, 1952

Citation:

Sgt. LeRoy A. Mendonca, distinguished himself by conspicuous gallantry above and beyond the call of duty in action against the enemy. After his platoon, in an exhaustive fight, had captured Hill 586, the newly won positions were assaulted during the night by a numerically superior enemy force. When the 1st Platoon positions were outflanked and under great pressure and the platoon was ordered to withdraw to a secondary line of defense, Sgt. Mendonca voluntarily remained in an exposed position and covered the platoon's withdrawal. Although under murderous enemy fire, he fired his weapon and hurled grenades at the onrushing enemy until his supply of ammunition was exhausted. He fought on, clubbing with his rifle and using his bayonet until he was mortally wounded. After the action it was estimated that Sgt. Mendonca had accounted for 37 enemy casualties. His daring actions stalled the crushing assault, protecting the platoon's withdrawal to secondary positions, and enabling the entire unit to repel the enemy attack and retain possession of the vital hilltop position. Sgt. Mendonca's extraordinary gallantry and exemplary valor are in keeping with the highest traditions of the U.S. Army.

Honors
In 2001, the Bob Hope-class roll on roll off vehicle cargo ship  was commissioned in the Military Sealift Command, and named in honor of Sergeant Mendonca.

See also

List of Medal of Honor recipients
List of Korean War Medal of Honor recipients

References/Notes

External links

1932 births
1951 deaths
United States Army Medal of Honor recipients
American military personnel killed in the Korean War
American people of Portuguese descent
People from Honolulu
Korean War recipients of the Medal of Honor
Burials in the National Memorial Cemetery of the Pacific
United States Army soldiers
United States Army personnel of the Korean War